Kaalicharan is a 2013 Indian Telugu-language political drama film that stars Chaitanya Krishna, Chandini Tamilarasan and Pankaj Kesari. The film marks the Telugu debut of Tamilarasan and Kesari. The film was dubbed into Tamil as Por Kuthirai.

Cast 
 Chaitanya Krishna as Kaalicharan
 Chandini Tamilarasan as Thirtha
 Pankaj Kesari as Pasupathy
 Kavitha Srinivasan as Pasupathy's mistress
 Nagineedu as Kaalicharan's father
 Rao Ramesh

Production 
The film is directed by Sri Prawin, a pupil of Ram Gopal Varma, who earlier made Gaayam 2 (2010). Kaali Charan stars Chaitanya Krishna and Tamil actress Chandini Tamilarasan in the lead roles while Bhojpuri actor Pankaj Kesari essays a negative role. The film is set in the 1980s and is based on the life of MLA Erra Satyam. The muhurat (launch) of the film took place in Hyderabad with Lakshmi Manchu, Allu Aravind, Tammareddy Bharadwaja, and Sundeep Kishan in attendance.

Soundtrack 
The songs are composed by Nandan Raj.

Reception 
The Times of India gave the film a rating of two out of five stars and wrote that "The problem you have with the movie is the director’s attempt to create suspense at some places. You feel cheated and taken for a ride". The Hindu wrote that "While it’s refreshing to see a filmmaker explore a new format and show courage in not introducing force-fit commercial elements, it’s a pity when a good attempt is letdown by tiresome narration".

References

External links

Indian political drama films